Clement James may refer to:

The ClementJames Centre, a British charity based in London
Clement James (footballer) (born 1981), British footballer